The old Town Hall is a former municipal facility in North Street, Wolverhampton, West Midlands, United Kingdom. It is a Grade II listed building.

History
The building was commissioned to replace an even earlier town hall located in High Green, now known as Queen Square, which had been built in around 1700.

The mayor, Henry Hartley Fowler, first introduced the initiative to build a new town hall in 1865. The site chosen for the new building was occupied by the Red Lion Inn which was purchased and demolished to facilitate the proposal. The new building was designed by Ernest Bates in the Renaissance style, built by a local contractor, Philip Horsman, and opened on 19 October 1871. The design of the building involved a 15-bay main frontage, with an entrance porch with paired pilasters, segmental-headed windows on the ground floor, round-headed windows on the first floor and pavilions at roof level.

The building became the meeting place of the local municipal borough council which secured county borough status in 1889. The Queen Mother visited the town hall and met with civic leaders on 3 June 1969.

Following the implementation of re-organisation associated with the Local Government Act 1972, the building briefly became the headquarters of Wolverhampton Metropolitan Borough Council, until the council moved to Wolverhampton Civic Centre in 1978. The old town hall then ceased to be used as a municipal facility and instead became the home of the Wolverhampton Law Courts. After Wolverhampton Crown Court moved to the new Wolverhampton Combined Court Centre in Pipers Row in 1991, the old town operated primarily as the local home of the magistrates courts. A proposal for the magistrates courts to move to a new complex in Darlington Street was considered in 2010, but subsequently abandoned as uneconomic, and so the building remains the home of the "Black County Magistrates Court".

Works of art inside the building include a large stature of the first mayor, George Benjamin Thorneycroft, which was sculpted by Thomas Thornycroft in 1851, and later installed within an alcove at the head of the staircase.

Notes

References

Buildings and structures in Wolverhampton
Government buildings completed in 1871
City and town halls in the West Midlands (county)
Grade II listed buildings in the West Midlands (county)